Amherst High School is a public high school located in Amherst, Wisconsin. It serves grades 9 through 12 and is the only high school in the Tomorrow River School District.

History 
The first dedicated high school building in Amherst was constructed in the spring of 1891; classes started that fall. The school switched from a three-year to four-year track in 1902.

Demographics 
The student body of AHS is 95 percent white, three percent Hispanic, one percent Native American, and one percent of students identify as a part of two or more races.

Academics 
Advanced Placement classes are offered at Amherst; just over a third of students take an AP exam.

Athletics 
Falcons athletic teams compete in the Central Wisconsin Conference. The school debuted a synthetic turf stadium for the 2019-2020 school year for the football and soccer teams.

Notable alumni 
Tyler Biadasz, football player
Dylan Page, basketball player

External links 
 Tomorrow River School District

References 

1891 establishments in Wisconsin
Educational institutions established in 1891
Schools in Portage County, Wisconsin
Public high schools in Wisconsin